This article is about the 2007 season of the Huddersfield Giants.

Results

Rounds 1–5
Round 1

Round 2

Round 3
NB Game played before Round 1 due to St Helens' involvement in World Club Challenge

Round 4

Round 5

Rounds 6–10
Round 6

Round 7

Round 8

Round 9

Round 10

Rounds 11–15
Round 11

Round 12

Round 13 – MILLENNIUM MAGIC

Round 14
 
Round 15

Rounds 16–20
Round 16

Round 17

Round 18

Round 19

Round 20

Rounds 21–27
Round 21

Round 22

Round 23

Round 24

Round 25

Round 26

Round 27

Playoffs

Super League XII table

1Deducted 2 points for breaching of salary cap rules.
2Deducted 4 points for breaching salary cap rules.

2007 Season players

2007 Signings

Transfers in

Transfers out

References

Huddersfield Giants seasons
Huddersfield Giants season